Delices is a small village in Dominica. It is located in the south-east of the island, between La Plaine and Petite Savanne.

The village's name derives from the French words délices, translated as "delights", or délice meaning "a delightful thing". Though not as developed as other parts of the island, its natural environment and views attract eco-tourists. It is home to the White River and Victoria Falls.

The village is home to the Jungle Bay Resort and Spa.

Notable residents
Delmance Ras Mo Moses: poet/musician/performing & recording artist, prevention educator, facilitator, youth worker, former Senior Cultural Officer with the Cultural Division Dominica
Singoalla Blomqvist-Williams: lawyer, farmer
Hon. Thomas P. Etienne, Minister of Agriculture 1970–1974 E. O. LeBlanc Administration: politician/farmer/educator, MP.
Mrs Helen Etienne, educator, former principal
Hon. Heskeith Alexander, politician/farmer, MP
Mr Ninian St.Louis. Bishop of Dominica Pentecostal Assemblies, farmer
Henckell L. Christian: educator, MP 
L. M. Christian MBE (1913–2000): composer of the music for Dominica's National Anthem
Hon. Gertrude Roberts: MP, educator/politician
Hon. L. C. Didier M.P. (1889–1987): educator/farmer/politician. 4-term ministerial portfolios, Dominica Legislature.
Capt. A. C. Randall, British World War I officer, who adopted this village.
Home of founder of Delices Church of God 7th Day, Elder Matthew Felix St.Rose (1938–2014), pastor/farmer/line fisherman/folk story teller, father of 12 children. Husband of Elizabeth" Titin" née St. Rose (1944–2003)
Clayton P. D. Didier, Chartered Civil Engineer (MICE, U.K.), author/poet.

References 

Populated places in Dominica
Saint Patrick Parish, Dominica